Hédard Joseph Robichaud  (November 2, 1911 – August 16, 1999) was an Acadian-Canadian Member of Parliament, Cabinet member, Senator and the first Acadian to be Lieutenant Governor of New Brunswick.

Born in Shippagan, New Brunswick, the son of Jean George Robichaud and Amanda Boudreau, he received a B.A. from the Université Saint-Joseph, later the University of Moncton, in 1931.

He first ran for the House of Commons as a Liberal candidate in a 1952 by-election in the riding of Gloucester, New Brunswick and lost. He was elected in the 1953 federal election, and was re-elected in the 1957, 1958, 1962, 1963 and 1965 elections. From 1963 to 1968, he was the Minister of Fisheries.

In 1968, he was appointed to the Senate representing the Senatorial division of Gloucester, New Brunswick. He resigned in 1971 to become the 24th  Lieutenant Governor of New Brunswick. He served in that position until 1981.

In 1985, he was made an Officer of the Order of Canada.

He was the husband of Gertrude Léger (1916-2011) and the father of nine.

Electoral record

References

External links
 

1911 births
1999 deaths
Acadian people
Canadian senators from New Brunswick
Liberal Party of Canada MPs
Liberal Party of Canada senators
Lieutenant Governors of New Brunswick
Members of the House of Commons of Canada from New Brunswick
Members of the King's Privy Council for Canada
Officers of the Order of Canada
People from Gloucester County, New Brunswick